Tuncer Bakirhan (born 1970, Susuz, Kars) is a former chairman of the Democratic People's Party (DEHAP) and the former Mayor of Siirt. He was dismissed from his duties as mayor by the Turkish ministry of the interior, arrested and sentenced to 10 years in prison.

Early life and education 
He grew up in Susuz and attended his primary and secondary education in Kars and studied at the Uludağ University in Bursa. During his studies he was detained and accused for supporting the Kurdistan Workers' Party (PKK) but released shortly after.

Political career 
He began to be involved in the youth wing of the People's Labour Party (HEP) in 1989 and was a candidate for Kars in the local election 1999, but was not elected. Later he was elected the party chairmen of the People's Democracy Party (HADEP) for the province of Kars. After the HADEP was closed down in 2003 he joined the DEHAP.

He was elected chairman of the DEHAP on the second extraordinary party congress in June 2003. In the parliamentary election in 2002 his party received the most votes in his electoral district but could not assume due to the fact that the party did not pass the electoral threshold. Under his leadership, the party initiated a peace campaign for the conflict between the PKK and the Turkish Government and he called for a general amnesty for the members of the PKK in order to facilitate the rebels to participate in the political process. The DEHAP dissolved itself in November 2005 and following he joined the Democratic Society Party (DTP) and became the parties vice chairmen. He was the DTP candidate for Esenyurt in the local elections 2009, but was not elected. In the local elections in 2014 he was elected the Mayor of Siirt for the Peace and Democracy Party (BDP). He was dismissed by the Ministry of Interior in November 2016 and detained the same day. He was formally arrested on the 16 December 2016 and in July 2018 he was sentenced to 10 years imprisonment for being a member of terrorist organization and making propaganda for a terrorist organization.

The European Court of Human Rights ruled against Turkey over his arrest in September 2021.

Other legal prosecution 
During his political career he was prosecuted many times often relating to "freedom of expression". In 2004 he was prosecuted for saying hello and good bye in Kurdish during an election rally. He was arrested on 17 January 2012 due to an investigation in the Kurdistan Communities Union (KCK) and released from prison on the 30 April 2013.

References 

Turkish Kurdish politicians
Democratic Society Party politicians
People expelled from public office
Politicians arrested in Turkey
People from Kars Province
People from Susuz
1970 births
Living people
Democratic People's Party (Turkey) politicians
People's Labor Party politicians